, better known to his contemporaries as , 
was a Japanese painter and printmaker who was widely regarded as a prolific woodblock artist during the Meiji epoch.

Names
Chikanobu signed his artwork . This was his .

Many of his earliest works were signed ; a small number of his early creations were simply signed .  At least one triptych from 12 Meiji (1879) exists signed .

The portrait of the Emperor Meiji held by the British Museum is inscribed .

No works have surfaced that are signed either "Toyohara Chikanobu" or "Hashimoto Chikanobu".

Military career
Chikanobu was a retainer of the Sakakibara clan of Takada Domain in Echigo Province. After the collapse of the Tokugawa Shogunate, he joined the Shōgitai and fought in the Battle of Ueno.

He joined Tokugawa loyalists in Hakodate, Hokkaidō, where he fought in the Battle of Hakodate at the Goryōkaku star fort.  He served under the leadership of Enomoto Takeaki and Ōtori Keisuke; and he achieved fame for his bravery.

Following the Shōgitai's surrender, he was remanded along with others to the authorities in the Takada domain.

Artistic career
In 1875 (Meiji 8), he decided to try to make a living as an artist.  He travelled to Tokyo. He found work as an artist for the Kaishin Shimbun. In addition, he produced nishiki-e artworks.  In his younger days, he had studied the Kanō school of painting; but his interest was drawn to ukiyo-e. He studied with a disciple of Keisai Eisen and then he joined the school of Ichiyūsai Kuniyoshi; during this period, he called himself Yoshitsuru. After Kuniyoshi’s death, he studied with Kunisada.   He also referred to himself as Yōshū.

Like many ukiyo-e artists, Chikanobu turned his attention towards a great variety of subjects.  His work ranged  from Japanese mythology to depictions of the battlefields of his lifetime to women's fashions. As well as a number of the other artists of this period, he too portrayed kabuki actors in character, and is well known for his impressions of the mie (mise en scène) of kabuki productions.  Chikanobu was known as a master of bijinga. images of beautiful women, and for illustrating changes in women's fashion, including both traditional and Western clothing. His work illustrated the changes in coiffures and make-up across time. For example, in Chikanobu's images in Mirror of Ages (1897), the hair styles of the Tenmei era, 1781-1789 are distinguished from those of the Keiō era, 1865-1867.  His works capture the transition from the age of the samurai to Meiji modernity, the artistic chaos of the Meiji period exemplifying the concept of "furumekashii/imamekashii".

Chikanobu is a recognizable Meiji period artist, but his subjects were sometimes drawn from earlier historical eras. For example, one print illustrates an incident during the 1855 Ansei Edo earthquake. The early Meiji period was marked by clashes between disputing samurai forces with differing views about ending Japan's self-imposed isolation and about the changing relationship between the Imperial court and the Tokugawa shogunate. He created a range of impressions and scenes of the Satsuma Rebellion and  Saigō Takamori.

The greatest number of Chikanobu's  appeared in triptych format. These works documented the First Sino-Japanese War of 1894-1895. For example, the "Victory at Asan" was published with a contemporaneous account of the July 29, 1894 battle.

Genres

Battle scenes 
Examples of  include:
 
 
Examples of scenes from this war include:

 
Examples of scenes from this war include:

 
Examples of scenes from this war include:

 
Examples of scenes from this war include:

Warrior prints
Examples of  include:

Beauty pictures 
Examples of  include:

Historical pictures 
Examples of  include:
Recent (Meiji era) history

Ancient history

Famous places 
Examples of  include:

Portraits 
Examples of  include:

Enlightenment pictures 
Examples of  include:

Theatre scenes 
Examples of  include:

Others:

Memorial prints
Examples of  include:

Women's pastimes
Examples of  include:

Emperor Meiji pictures
Examples of Emperor Meiji relaxing include:

Contrast pictures
Examples of  include:

Glorification of the Geisha
Examples of this genre include:

Formats

Like the majority of his contemporaries, he worked mostly in the ōban tate-e format. There are quite a number of single panel series, as well as many other prints in this format which are not a part of any series.

He produced several series in the ōban yoko-e format, which were usually then folded cross-wise to produce an album.

Although he is, perhaps, best known for his triptychs, single topics and series, two diptych series are known as well. There are, at least, three polyptych prints known.

His signature may also be found in the line drawings and illustrations in a number of ehon (絵本), which were mostly of a historical nature.  In addition, there are fan prints uchiwa-e (団扇絵), as well as number of sheets of  sugoroku (すごろく) with his signature that still exist and at least three prints in the kakemono-e format were produced in his latter years.

Selected works
In a statistical overview derived from writings by and about Hashimoto Toyohara, OCLC/WorldCat encompasses roughly 300+ works in 300+ publications in 2 languages and 700+ library holdings

  (1878)
  (1878)
  (1879)
  (1880)
  (1880)
  (1880)
  (1880)
  (1880)
  (1880)
  (1880)
  (1880)
  (1880)
  (1881)
  (1881)
  (1882)
  (1888)
  (1888)

See also
 List of works by Toyohara Chikanobu
 List of ukiyo-e terms
 War artist

Notes

Further reading 
 Cavaye, Ronald; Paul Griffith; Akihiko Senda and Mansai Nomura. (2004). A Guide to the Japanese Stage: from Traditional to Cutting Edge. Tokyo: Kōdansha. ; 
 Coats, Bruce; Kyoko Kurita; Joshua S. Mostow and Allen Hockley. (2006). Chikanobu: Modernity And Nostalgia in Japanese Prints. Leiden: Hotei. ; ; 
 Till, Barry. (2010). "Woodblock Prints of Meiji Japan (1868-1912): A View of History Though Art".  Hong Kong: Arts of Asia.  Vol. XL, no.4, pp. 76–98. ;

External links

Chikanobu and Yoshitoshi Woodblock Prints in the Claremont Colleges Digital Library 
Chikanobu: The Artist's Eye
Ukiyo-e Prints by Toyohara Chikanobu
Biography of Toyohara Chikanobu, Artelino
Biography of Toyohara Chikanobu, Robyn Butin of Honolulu
Biography of Toyohara Chikanobu, Ukiyo-e.com

1838 births
1912 deaths
19th-century Japanese painters
20th-century Japanese painters
20th-century printmakers
Utagawa school
Fa:تویوهارا چیکانوبو